Pompey Callaway House is a historic home located near Elliston, Montgomery County, Virginia.  The house was built about 1910, and is a two-story, three bay brick dwelling with a single pile central passage plan. Its builder, Pompey Callaway, was an ex-slave from Franklin County. It is one of the most substantial houses built for an African-American owner in Montgomery County before 1920.

It was listed on the National Register of Historic Places in 1989.

References

African-American history of Virginia
Houses on the National Register of Historic Places in Virginia
Houses completed in 1910
Houses in Montgomery County, Virginia
National Register of Historic Places in Montgomery County, Virginia
Elliston, Virginia